Hendrika Cornelia "Rie" de Balbian Verster-Bolderheij (born Hendrika Cornelia Bolderheij; 25 February 1890 – 12 March 1990) was a Dutch painter. She attended the Dagtekenschool voor meisjes (Day drawing school for girls) in Amsterdam. She submitted some of her work into the "Paintings" event of the "Mixed Painting" category of the art competitions at the 1928 Summer Olympics, but did not win a medal. 

She was born in Amsterdam in 1890 and married publicist Jan François Leopold de Balbian Verster in 1910. She was a member of Amsterdam's Arti et Amicitiae society and the Vereeniging Sint Lucas (Amsterdam). Balbian Verster-Bolderheij's work was included in the 1939 exhibition and sale Onze Kunst van Heden (Our Art of Today) at the Rijksmuseum in Amsterdam. She died in Weesp on 12 March 1990 at the age of 100.

References

1890 births
1990 deaths
Dutch centenarians
Olympic competitors in art competitions
Painters from Amsterdam
20th-century Dutch painters
Women centenarians